TAN-1057 C and TAN-1057 D are organic compounds found in the Flexibacter sp. PK-74 bacterium.  TAN-1057 C and D are closely related structurally as diastereomers.  Also related are TAN-1057 A and TAN-1057 B, isolated from the same bacteria.  The four compounds have been shown to be an effective antibiotics against methicillin-resistant strains of Staphylococcus aureus which act through the inhibition of protein biosynthesis.

References

Antibiotics
Alkaloids
Guanidines
Lactams
Diazepines